Mads Søgaard (born 13 December 2000) is a Danish professional ice hockey goaltender for the  Ottawa Senators of the National Hockey League (NHL). He was selected by the Senators in the second round, 37th overall, in the 2019 NHL Entry Draft. After two seasons in the American Hockey League, Søgaard made his NHL debut with the Senators in 2022. Internationally he has played for the Danish national team at the junior level in several tournaments.

Playing career
Søgaard spent his early career in his native Denmark. In 2017 he moved to North America, and spent one season with the Austin Bruins of the North American Hockey League, playing 22 games for them. He was selected 32nd overall in the 2018 CHL Import Draft by the Medicine Hat Tigers of the Western Hockey League, and joined the team that year. After his first season with Medicine Hat, he was the second-ranked North American-based goalie, and was drafted by the Ottawa Senators in the second round, 37th overall, in the 2019 NHL Entry Draft. He briefly played for the Esbjerg Energy in the Danish Metal Ligaen due to the COVID-19 pandemic. In his first professional season, he posted a 10–5–1 record with a 2.58 goals-against average (GAA) and a .922 save percentage in 16 games for the Energy. He then joined the Senators' American Hockey League (AHL) affiliate, the Belleville Senators in 2020 in the middle of the pandemic-shortened season. Søgaard performed well in his first few games, recording a 7-0-0 record in all of his AHL appearances.

On 13 April 2021, the Senators signed Søgaard to a three-year, entry-level contract. He began the 2021–22 season with the Belleville Senators and posted a 16–13–1 record with a 2.87 GAA and a .906 save percentage in 31 games prior to being recalled by the Ottawa Senators. He made his NHL debut for Ottawa on 1 April 2022, in a 5–2 victory over the Detroit Red Wings. He is the second Danish goalie in NHL history, after Frederik Andersen.

Career statistics

Regular season and playoffs

References

External links
 

2000 births
Living people
Austin Bruins players
Belleville Senators players
Danish ice hockey goaltenders
Danish expatriate ice hockey people
Esbjerg Energy players
Medicine Hat Tigers players
Ottawa Senators draft picks
Ottawa Senators players
Sportspeople from Aalborg